Agnes MacKenzie (born 12 October 1955) is a Scottish television personality, cleaner and writer. She is known for presenting the Channel 4 series How Clean Is Your House? and the ITV daytime series Storage Hoarders.

Career
One of Mackenzie's first jobs was working for the Secret Intelligence Service. It was Mackenzie's position with Good Housekeeping which led to her being asked to take a screen test for a new show which would become How Clean Is Your House? Her screen test was successful and she was teamed up with professional cleaner Kim Woodburn in August 2002 following a brief partnership with another cleaner named Sue. The duo have produced books, games and DVDs due to the popularity of the series. MacKenzie appeared on The Oprah Winfrey Show in the USA, where How Clean Is Your House? aired on BBC America.

She also appeared as a guest presenter on STV's daily lifestyle show The Hour, alongside anchor Stephen Jardine for two days in September 2009 and for four days in April 2010. In 2011, she participated in Celebrity Masterchef. In December 2012, Aggie presented the ITV programme Storage Hoarders, which returned for a second series in August 2013.

Philanthropy
MacKenzie has her own charity called Ukuthasa, which supports people in townships in South Africa, helping them with healthcare, education and housing. In an interview with Channel 4 she said: "Whenever I can, such as with this interview, I donate my fee to [the charity]".

Personal life
MacKenzie was married to architect Matthew Goulcher from 1991 until 2010. They have two sons.

Filmography 

 How Clean Is Your House? - Channel 4 (2003–2009)
 V Graham Norton - Channel 4 (2003)
 Children in Need - BBC One (2003)
 The Terry and Gaby Show - Channel 5 (2003)
 Hogmanay Live - STV (2003)
 National Television Awards Party of the Year (2004)
 Hell's Kitchen - ITV (2004)
 BBC Breakfast - BBC One/BBC News 24 (2004)
 Friday Night with Jonathan Ross - BBC One (2004)
 Too Posh To Wash - Channel 4 (2004)
 This Morning - ITV (2004)
 EastEnders - BBC One (2004)
 Today with Des and Mel - ITV (2005)
 Dirty Tricks (2005)
 The Paul O'Grady Show - ITV/Channel 4 (2005, 2006)
 The F-Word - Channel 4 (2005)
 The 100 Greatest Family Films - Channel 4 (2005)
 Grumpy Old Women - BBC Two (2006)
 Richard & Judy - Channel 4 (2006)
 Come Dine with Me - Channel 4 (2006)
 The Mint - ITV (2006)
 Hogmanay Stories - STV (2006)
 Dancing on Ice - ITV (2008)
 Loose Women - ITV (2008)
 Hider in the House - BBC Two (2008)
 The Hour - STV (2009)
 All Star Family Fortunes - ITV (2010)
 Celebrity MasterChef - BBC One, BBC Two (2011)
 Who's Doing the Dishes? - ITV (2014)
Lorraine - ITV (2018)

Bibliography
How Clean Is Your House? with Kim Woodburn (2003) 
Too Posh to Wash: The Complete Guide to Cleaning Up Your Life with Kim Woodburn (2004) 
The Cleaning Bible: Kim and Aggie's Complete Guide to Modern Household Management with Kim Woodburn (2006)

References

External links
 
 Aggie MacKenzies' charity, Ukuthasa.org

1955 births
Living people
Scottish television presenters
Scottish women television presenters
People from Highland (council area)